Drita D'Avanzo (née Selmani; born February 6, 1976) is an American reality star who appeared on the VH1 series Mob Wives from 2011 to 2016. She also appeared on Mob Wives spinoff Big Ang.

D'Avanzo grew up in Staten Island after her family migrated from Albania.

On The Tomorrow Show with Keven Undergaro D'Avanzo stated that she is working on a spinoff of her own. D'Avanzo makes regular appearances as herself on television, with notables including Celebrity Ghost Stories and Watch What Happens: Live. In August 2017, she was announced as a cast member on the Big Brother-style VH1 reality show Scared Famous. She is known for her hot-tempered personality.

D'Avanzo has worked for several upscale cosmetic companies as a freelance makeup artist and has launched her own cosmetics line called "Lady Boss by Drita".

She and her husband Lee D'Avanzo, who federal prosecutors allege is the leader of the Bonanno and Colombo crime family farm team, were arrested on December 19, 2019; they were charged with criminal drug and multiple firearms possession after a search warrant was executed on their home.  The firearms were a .38-caliber revolver and a 9 mm, both loaded with hollow-point bullets.  On February 21, 2020, the charges against her were dropped, while Lee pleaded not guilty to gun possession charges. On March 20, 2020, Lee pleaded guilty to the charge.  On 7 August 2020, D'Avanzo was sentenced to 64 months (5-1/3 years) in prison for the offenses.  In sentencing him, the judge cited his extensive criminal history, which entails six convictions.  He is currently incarcerated at FCI McKean, a medium security Federal prison located in Lewis Run, Pennsylvania.  As of May 2021, he is 52 years old.  His scheduled release date is 14 July 2024.

References

External links
 

Living people
Participants in American reality television series
American people of Albanian descent
1976 births